The Pro Patria Medal is a South African military campaign medal which was instituted by the Republic in 1974. It was awarded to members of the South African Defence Force for service in an operational area, as designated by the Minister of Defence or for engagement in armed combat with the enemy.

The South African military
The Union Defence Forces (UDF) were established in 1912 and renamed the South African Defence Force (SADF) in 1958. On 27 April 1994, it was integrated with six other independent forces into the South African National Defence Force (SANDF).

Institution
The Pro Patria Medal was instituted by the State President in 1974.

Award criteria
The medal could be awarded to serving members of all ranks of the South African Defence Force. The conditions for award stipulated that the recipient had to have:
 been involved in combat or a skirmish or combat situation or an incident caused by enemy activities, or
 participated in a specific operation acknowledged by the Minister of Defence, or
 served for a continuous period of 55 days or non-continuous for 90 days in an operational area as designated by the Minister of Defence.

The wording on the certificate of award reads "The Pro Patria Medal was awarded for service in the defence of the Republic or for the prevention or suppression of terrorism".

Order of wear

The position of the Pro Patria Medal in the official order of precedence was revised three times after 1975, to accommodate the inclusion or institution of new decorations and medals.

South African Defence Force until 26 April 1994
  
Official SADF order of precedence:
 Preceded by the Korea Medal.
 Succeeded by the Southern Africa Medal.
Official national order of precedence:
 Preceded by the South African Police Medal for Combating Terrorism.
 Succeeded by the South African Railways Police Medal for Combating Terrorism.

South African National Defence Force from 27 April 1994
  
Official SANDF order of precedence:
 Preceded by the Korea Medal of the Union of South Africa.
 Succeeded by the General Service Medal of the Republic of Venda.
Official national order of precedence:
 Preceded by the South African Police Medal for Combating Terrorism of the Republic of South Africa.
 Succeeded by the Bophuthatswana Police Medal for Combating Terrorism of the Republic of Bophuthatswana.

The position of the Pro Patria Medal in the order of precedence remained unchanged, as it was on 27 April 1994, when decorations and medals were belatedly instituted in April 1996 for the two former non-statutory forces, the Azanian People's Liberation Army and Umkhonto we Sizwe, and again when a new series of military decorations and medals was instituted in South Africa on 27 April 2003.

Description

Obverse

Reverse
The pre-1994 South African Coat of Arms is on the reverse, with the medal number stamped underneath.

Ribbon

Versions
The early medals and ribbon suspenders were minted separately and attached to each other with rings which enabled the medal to swing. On the original medal, the roundel on the obverse was also minted separately. The earliest version of the medal was minted by the South African Mint, but from c. 1980, further production of the medal was put out to tender by private enterprises. As a result, several versions appeared, nearly all minted with the ribbon suspender as an integral part of the medal and some still with a separately minted roundel, some without the gilding, and some minted with both the ribbon suspender and the roundel as an integral part of the medal.

Mentioned in dispatches

A recipient of the Pro Patria Medal who was mentioned in dispatches during the 1966-1989 Border War, was entitled to wear a miniature Coat of Arms on the medal ribbon and ribbon bar.

Clasps and Bars

Clasps
Only the Cunene clasp was awarded, to members who served in Angola during Operation Savannah in 1975 and 1976. Recipients of the clasp wear a button, with the letter C encircled by a wreath, on the ribbon bar.

Bars
Although the 1974 warrant made provision for bars, none were authorised.

Discontinuation
Conferment of the Pro Patria Medal was discontinued in respect of services performed on or after 27 April 2003.

Government Warrants

References

Military decorations and medals of South Africa
1974 establishments in South Africa
Awards established in 1974